Hong Seong-ik (born 1 September 1940) is a former South Korean cyclist. He competed in the team time trial at the 1964 Summer Olympics.

References

1940 births
Living people
South Korean male cyclists
Olympic cyclists of South Korea
Cyclists at the 1964 Summer Olympics
Sportspeople from South Chungcheong Province